Madre means mother in many Romance languages, and it may also refer to:

Madré, a commune in the Mayenne department of northwestern France
Mądre, a village in the Greater Poland Voivodeship, in west-central Poland
Isola Madre, an Italian island
Tillandsia 'Madre'
Jean de Madre (1862–1934), English polo player
Madre (film), a 2016 Colombian short film
Madre, a 2016 Chilean horror film written and directed by Aaron Burns
Mother (2017 Spanish film), a 2017 Spanish short film
Madre (EP), a 2021 EP by Arca

See also
Sierra Madre (disambiguation)